The cinema of Mongolia has been strongly influenced by the cinema of Russia, which differentiates it from cinematic developments in the rest of Asia.

History 
It is assumed that the first cinematographic performances in Mongolia happened between 1903 and 1913, as private events for the prince Tögs-Ochiryn Namnansüren and the Jebtsundamba in the capital Urga.

After the socialist revolution, the Mongolian People's Revolutionary Party decided in its fifth congress of 1925 to use movies as an instrument of mass education. From 1926 on, mobile projection facilities would regularly show Soviet films to the Mongolian people. The first permanent cinema, Ard ('people') opened in the capital (now named Ulaanbaatar) in 1934. Eventually, every aimag center would have fixed cinemas, and every sums of Mongolia or negdel would have a mobile cinema. In the 1990s, many cinemas, fixed and mobile alike, closed down or reduced activities.

Mongol Kino 
The national film studios, Mongol Kino, were founded in 1935, with Soviet technical assistance. Their first productions were a documentary on the "47th anniversary of the 1st May" and a fictional story named A Mongol son directed by the Russian Ilya Trauberg and Mongolian Demberel Baldan. The first Mongolian-directed movie was the black-and-white short feature Norjmaa's Destiny by Baldan in 1938.

From then on, Mongolian movie production focused on heroic revolutionary propaganda and ancient popular legends, still often under Russian direction. This program was very successful with movies like Sükhbaatar (1942) and Tsogt Taij (1945). The studios of Mongol Kino also produced documentaries and current news reports.

1950s and 1960s 
After World War II, the party moved the focus on working-class heroes, reflected in movies like New Year (Shine Jil, 1954) by Tseveeny Zandraa. Examples of this genre are Awakening (Serelt, 1957) by S. Genden and The Rejected Girl by Dendevyn Chimid-Osor. In 1955, the first musical comedy appeared, which started a trend that continued into the 1960s. The first color movie was The Golden Yurt (1961), based on a folktale. It was produced in cooperation with the East German DEFA studios. The music of the film, written by L. Mördorj, was played and recorded by the GDR Radio orchestra and became a classic of the Mongolian symphony. As a fairy tale film, it is rich with match moving and other cinematographic special effects.

1970s and 1980s 
While the production of documentaries increased, fictional stories turned to everyday life in the 1970s. One of the most famous movies of that time, The Crystal Clear Tamir River (1970) by Ravjagiin Dorjpalam, based on the novel by Chadraabalyn Lodoidamba, is however set during Mongolia's 1921 revolution. Other well-known productions were The Legend of the Mother Oasis, made in 1976 by Gombojav Jigjidsuren and Jamyangiin Buntar, and The Five Colors of the Rainbow in 1979. The Leading Wrestler Garuda (1983), by Jamyangiin Buntar, marks a turning point where the authors liberate themselves from existing power structures. Queen Mandukhai the Wise (Mongolian: , 1987) is a Mongolian film based on a novel of the same title by Shagdarjavyn Natsagdorj (1981) and directed by Begziin Baljinnyam, marking the reflection of the political reformation movement perestroika in Mongolia.

1990s and 2000s 
After the introduction of the market economy, most mobile and permanent cinemas closed down. Mongolian productions had to seek partners outside of the former COMECON. However, some young filmmakers of the transformation period, such as N. Gankhuyag, B. Uranchimeg, and J. Binder, made successful domestic films.

The movie Genghis Khan, Under Power of the Eternal Sky, starring Enkhtaivan Agvaantseren, was the first Mongolian-Japanese co-production. State of Dogs (1998) was written and directed collaboratively by the Belgian Peter Brosens and the Mongolian Dorjkhandyn Turmunkh.

The director Byambasuren Davaa has had international success with the German-Mongolian co-productions The Story of the Weeping Camel (2003, nominated for an Academy Award as a foreign documentary in 2005) and The Cave of the Yellow Dog (2005).

 (Movement of Sand), was a successful movie produced for the domestic market in 2007.

The 2008 historical film A Pearl in the Forest by director Enkhtaivan Agvaantseren is one of the first films to openly talk about the events of the 1930s and the impact of the rise of Soviet communism on Mongolia. It is also one of the first films intended to present the history of the Buryats, one of the ethnic groups present in Mongolia.

See also 
 East Asian cinema
 List of Mongolian films
 Culture of Mongolia
 Enkhtaivan Agvaantseren
 Byambasuren Davaa

References

External links 
 Report on the history of cinemas in Uvs and Bayan-Ölgii
 List of films produced by Mongol Kino
 IMDB list of Mongolian movies